Vojvodina League East is a section of the Zone Leagues, Serbia's fourth football league. The league is operated by the Football Association of Vojvodina.

Vojvodina League East consisted of 16 clubs from North Banat District, Central Banat District and South Banat District who played each other in a double round-robin league, with each club playing the other club home and away. At the end of the season the top club was promoted to Serbian League Vojvodina.

Champions history

See also
Serbian SuperLiga
Serbian First League
Serbian League
Serbian Zone League

References
Vojvođanska liga "Istok", SrbijaSport.net

Defunct football leagues in Serbia
Football in Vojvodina
Vo